Abrahadabra is a word that first publicly appeared in The Book of the Law (1904), the central sacred text of Thelema. Its author, Aleister Crowley, described it as "the Word of the Aeon, which signifieth The Great Work accomplished."  This is in reference to his belief that the writing of Liber Legis (another name for "The Book of the Law") heralded a new Aeon for mankind that was ruled by the god Ra-Hoor-Khuit (a form of Horus). Abrahadabra is, therefore, the "magical formula" of this new age. It is not to be confused with the Word of the Law of the Aeon, which is Thelema, meaning "Will".

Description
Crowley replaced the 'C' in "Abracadabra" with an 'H', which the Hermetic Order of the Golden Dawn in their Neophyte ritual linked with Breath and Life as well as with the god Horus. Aleister Crowley had taken the place of Horus or the Hierus officer in the Golden Dawn's Neophyte ritual, which means that he personally gave the response explaining the meaning of the letter 'H'.

Crowley explains in his essay "Gematria" that he changed the magick word to include 'H' because of qabalistic methods. He appears to say that this happened before his January 1901 meeting with Oscar Eckenstein, one of his teachers. At this meeting, Eckenstein ordered Crowley to put aside magick for the moment, and to practice meditation or concentration. In "Gematria", Crowley says he took great interest in Abrahadabra, and its qabalistic number 418, at the time someone ordered him to "abandon the study of magic and the Qabalah". In the Book of Thoth, Crowley refers to Abrahadabra as a 'cypher' of the Great Work.

The word "Abrahadabra" appears repeatedly in the 1904 invocation of Horus that preceded the writing of Liber Legis and led to the founding of Thelema. It also appears in a May 1901 diary that Crowley published in The Equinox.

The essay "Gematria" gives Hindu, Christian, and "Unsectarian" versions of the problem that Crowley intended this magick word to answer. He also gives a qabalistic equivalent for each phrasing, and a brief symbolic answer for each. The unsectarian version reads, "I am the finite square; I wish to be one with the infinite circle." Its equivalent refers to "the Cross of Extension" and "the infinite Rose." Crowley's numerological explanation of "ABRAHADABRA" focuses mainly on this last formulation and the answer to it.

"Abrahadabra" is also referred to as the "Word of Double Power". More specifically, it represents the uniting of the Microcosm with the Macrocosm—represented by the pentagram and the hexagram, the rose and the cross, the circle and the square, the 5 and the 6 (etc.), as also called the attainment of the Knowledge and Conversation of one's Holy Guardian Angel. In "Commentaries" (1996), Crowley says that the word is a symbol of the "establishment of the pillar or phallus of the Macrocosm...in the void of the Microcosm."

Mystical interpretations

Gematria
As with most things found in the mystical works of Aleister Crowley, the word "Abrahadabra" can be examined using the qabalistic method of gematria, which is a form of numerology, whereby correspondences are made based on numerical values.

ABRAHADABRA = 418
ABRAHADABRA has 11 letters
ABRAHADABRA = 1+2+2+1+5+1+4+1+2+2+1 = 22
The five letters in the word are: A, the Crown; B, the Wand; D, the Cup; H, the Sword; R, the Rosy Cross; and refer further to Amoun the Father, Thoth His messenger, and Isis, Horus, Osiris, the divine-human triad.
Also 418 = ATh IAV, the Essence of IAO, translated from Hebrew as “Thou art IAO”
418 = BVLShKIN, or Boleskine
418 = RA HVVR, or Ra Hoor
418 = , a Hebrew spelling of Heru-Ra-Ha
418 = , a Greek spelling of Aiwass
418 = The sum of all integers between 13 and 31 inclusive.
Abrahadabra is from Abraxas, Father Sun, which = 365
 418 = 22 x 19 Manifestation

Other
Where AbraCadabra means “I create as I speak” in Aramaic, abraHaDabra, roughly speaking, means “I create the speech”, in Hebrew.

Had is the keyword of Abrahadabra. Had is another name for Hadit, the second Speaker in Liber Legis ("The Book of the Law").
"ABRAHADABRA is "The key of the rituals" because it expresses the Magical Formulae of uniting various complementary ideas; especially the Five of the Microcosm with the Six of the Macrocosm."
 "Abrahadabra is the glyph of the blending of the 5 and the 6, the Rose and the Cross."

References

Notes

Citations

Works cited

Primary sources

Secondary sources

Other sources

Thelemapedia. (2004). Abrahadabra. Retrieved April 16, 2006.

Further reading
Crowley, Aleister. (1982). 777 and Other Qabalistic Writings. York Beach, Me. : S. Weiser.

Magic words
Thelema